Rex Woods may refer to:

 Rex Woods (artist) (1903–1987), English-born Canadian artist and illustrator
 Rex Woods (athlete) (1891–1986), British athlete

See also 
 Rex Wood (1909–1970), South Australian artist in Portugal